The Power Macintosh 9500 (sold as Power Macintosh 9515 in Europe and Asia) is a personal computer designed, manufactured and sold by Apple Computer from June 1995 to February 1997. It is powered by a PowerPC 604 processor, a second-generation PowerPC chip which is faster than the PowerPC 601 chip used in the Power Macintosh 8100. The 180MP and  models, introduced August 1996, use the enhanced PowerPC 604e processor.

MacWorld Magazine gave the 9500 a positive review, concluding that it is "not the second-generation Power Mac for the rest of us — it's too pricey .... but it is an excellent foundation for a high-end graphics workstation — for color publishing or media production. Its speed and expandability should also made it popular in the scientific and technical markets." Their benchmarks showed that the 9500 outperformed the Quadra 950 when running older Mac software in the Mac 68k emulator, posting speeds almost twice as fast as the Quadra 900.

The 9500 was replaced by the Power Macintosh 9600.

Hardware 

The 9500 includes several technological firsts for Apple. The CPU is connected via a daughterboard, and so can be swapped easily. Available were single-processor cards ranging from 120 to 200 MHz, and a dual processor card with two 180 MHz CPUs. This is also the first Macintosh to use the PCI standard, with six PCI slots available -- one of which must be used for a graphics card. Infoworld's Anita Epler noted that "Because most multimedia developers don't use the onboard video found on previous Mac models, Apple wisely economized by simply leaving it out. Users can purchase their own PCI graphics card or opt for Apple's 64-bit accelerated PCI video board with 2 MB of VRAM as an optional accessory." 

The 9500 is also the first computer from Apple to support 168-pin DIMM memory modules, and the 512 KB of on-board 128-bit-wide cache utilizes copy-back instead of write-through, offering faster speeds than prior Macintosh models, as well as the ability to install single modules. The logic board has a total of 12 memory slots; like the Power Macintosh 8100, installing memory requires removing the logic board from the case. When it was introduced, 64 MB DIMMs were the largest available on the market, making for a maximum memory limit of 768 MB. Companies like Advantage Memory were selling DIMMs of this size for $3,900 USD each. 128 MB DIMMs were introduced later in 1995, offering a theoretical limit of 1.5 GB memory, though System 7.5.2 is unable to use more than 1 GB of memory.

Some other firsts for a Macintosh include a regular 10BASE-T ethernet port alongside the AAUI port, as well as support for the new SCSI-2 Fast standard, and a 4X CD-ROM.

The basic design of the logic board, called "Tsunami", was used by various Macintosh clone makers as a reference design  and a modified version was used in the non-Macintosh Apple Network Server series.

Utilizing a third-party G4 CPU upgrade and the XPostFacto installation utility it is possible to run up to Mac OS X v10.5 "Leopard" on a 9500, making it the oldest model capable of running Mac OS X.

Models 
Included as standard with all models are 16 MB RAM, 1 GB HDD, and AppleCD 600i 4x CD-ROM.

Introduced June 19, 1995:
 Power Macintosh 9500/120
 Power Macintosh 9500/132: 132 MHz CPU, 2 GB HDD.

Introduced October 2, 1995:
 Power Macintosh 9515/132: Same as the 9500/132, sold in Europe and Asia.

Introduced April 22, 1996:
 Power Macintosh 9500/150: 150 MHz CPU, 16 or 32 MB RAM, 2 GB HDD.

Introduced August 7, 1996:
 Power Macintosh 9500/180MP: Two 180 MHz PowerPC 604e CPUs, 16 or 32 MB RAM, 2 GB HDD, AppleCD 1200i 8x CD-ROM.
 Power Macintosh 9500/200: 16 or 32 MB RAM, 2 GB HDD, AppleCD 1200i 8x CD-ROM.

Timeline

References

External links

 Low End Mac's Power Macintosh 9500 page

9500
9500
Macintosh towers
Computer-related introductions in 1995